Laelia gouldiana is a plant of the orchid genus Laelia.

Former distribution
The orchid, now is extinct in the wild, was endemic to the mountains of Hidalgo state in central Mexico. It grew as an epiphyte on trees in its native habitats.

Cultivation
Laelia gouldiana is now only found and grown as a cultivated ornamental plant.

It has pink flowers.

It prefers an extended dry period between waterings, cooler temperatures, and lower humidity than most Laelia species.

References

External links 
 Flora33.com: Photos of Laelia gouldiana

gouldiana
Endemic orchids of Mexico
Flora of Hidalgo (state)
Critically endangered biota of Mexico
Plants extinct in the wild
Extinct flora of North America
Epiphytic orchids
Garden plants of North America